The list details all government of India-owned public sector undertakings in India.

Public sector companies 
Central public sector enterprises (CPSEs) are those companies in which the direct holding of the Central Government or other CPSEs is 51% or more.

As on 31.3.2015 there were 298 CPSEs wherein, 63 enterprises are yet to commence commercial operation. The remaining 235 are operating enterprises (covering 181 scheduled CPSEs & 54 CPSEs has been considered provisional).

There are 181 scheduled CPSEs, i.e. 64 Schedule 'A', 68 Schedule 'B', 45 Schedule 'C' and 4 Schedule 'D' CPSEs.

Privatised/Acquired/Merged Public Sector Companies

Liquidated public sector companies

References

 
India government-related lists